Sioux Falls Stadium is a multi-purpose stadium in Sioux Falls, South Dakota. It originally opened in 1941 and was renovated in 2000.

It is primarily used for baseball and is the home field of the unaffiliated Sioux Falls Canaries baseball team of the American Association. It was their home stadium when they won the American Association championship in 2008. Promoting the home team, the stadium is often affectionately proclaimed "The Birdcage". The stadium has a capacity of up to 4,462 people.

References

Baseball venues in South Dakota
Sports venues in Sioux Falls, South Dakota
Minor league baseball venues
1941 establishments in South Dakota